Moonville may refer to:
Moonville, Indiana
Moonville, Ohio

See also
 Moenville, South Dakota
 Monoville, California